Uncovered was a British documentary show that was broadcast on Sky One from 6 July 1997 to 26 May 2002.

Transmissions

Series

Specials

References

1990s British reality television series
2000s British reality television series
1997 British television series debuts
2002 British television series endings
1990s British travel television series
2000s British travel television series
London Weekend Television shows
Sky UK original programming
Television series by ITV Studios
English-language television shows
Television shows set in Spain